Robert Corr Breitenstein (born May 8, 1943) is a former a professional American football player in the American Football League and National Football League for the Denver Broncos, Minnesota Vikings, and Atlanta Falcons. He played college football at the University of Tulsa. He is distinguished as being the first Argentine to play in the National Football League.

Early years
Breitenstein attended Farmington High School, where he was a teammate of future NFL player Ralph Neely.

He accepted a scholarship from the University of Tulsa and was a part of the team that defeated Ole Miss, 14-7 in the 1964 Bluebonnet Bowl.

In 1994, he was inducted into the University of Tulsa Athletic Hall of Fame.

Professional career

Denver Broncos
Breitenstein was selected in the fifth round (33rd overall) of the 1965 AFL draft by the Denver Broncos. He was also selected by the Washington Redskins in the second round (21st overall) of the 1965 NFL Draft. He signed with the Broncos, although he later tried to invalidate the contract.

As a rookie, he shared the starter left tackle position with Lee Bernet. The next year, he became the regular starter. He was traded to the Minnesota Vikings in exchange for a fifth round draft choice (#117-Mike Bragg).

Minnesota Vikings
On October 4, 1967, he was activated from the taxi squad and played in 11 games. On August 5, 1968, he walked out of training camp in a contract dispute and was placed on the reserve list. On October 19, he was traded to the Chicago Bears in exchange for a draft pick.

Chicago Bears
In 1968, he was declared inactive in 9 games. He was waived on September 16, 1969.

Atlanta Falcons
In 1969, he signed with the Atlanta Falcons and played in 10 games. In 1970, after playing in 7 games, he was lost for the year with a knee injury. An automobile accident 9 days before the 1971 training camp complicated the injury and was not able to recover. He was released on August 23.

Personal information
After football, he owned and operated an insurance agency. He was a vice president of the National Football League Players Association  for the state of Oklahoma. He appeared in the movie Brian's Song, when the director used actual footage, showing him helping cart running back Gale Sayers off on a stretcher.

References

External links
 University of Tulsa Athletic Hall of Fame bio.

1943 births
Living people
American football offensive linemen
Denver Broncos (AFL) players
Minnesota Vikings players
Chicago Bears players
Atlanta Falcons players
Tulsa Golden Hurricane football players
Sportspeople from Buenos Aires
Argentine players of American football